Hesar (also Romanized as Ḩeşār; also known as Hisār, Hissār, and Khissar) is a village in Karasf Rural District of the Central District of Khodabandeh County, Zanjan province, Iran. At the 2006 National Census, its population was 1,437 in 361 households. The following census in 2011 counted 1,785 people in 441 households. The latest census in 2016 showed a population of 1,688 people in 479 households; it was the largest village in its rural district.

References 

Khodabandeh County

Populated places in Zanjan Province

Populated places in Khodabandeh County